The Hungarian National American Football Team is the official American football senior national team of Hungary. They are organized by the Hungarian American Football Association (Magyar Amerikai Futball Szövetség, MAFSZ). They get their players mostly from teams of the Hungarian American Football League.

History
The Hungarian national team was founded in 2013. The head coach was Lee Hlavka, the offensive coordinator is István Kovács, and the defensive coordinator was Karim Trabelsi. They played their first game with Czech Republic in Budapest, where they lost 7–26. In 2015, they participated in the first round of the qualifying round for 2018 European Championship against Serbia in Voždovac Stadium, Belgrade (0–56).

In 2016 Vilmos Grátz became the HC, the OC remained Kovács, and the DC became László Pacuk. In 2016, they played 2 friendly games against Poland and Belgium.

In 2016, the under 19 team was founded, and they played their first friendly match against Slovakia.

Matches

Roster

Squad for 2015 European Championship qualification:

See also 
 Hungarian American Football League

References

External links
Official website at MAFSZ (Hungarian).

Hungary
American football teams in Hungary
American Football
2013 establishments in Hungary
American football teams established in 2013